Gilbert Herman Brack (March 29, 1908 – January 20, 1960) was a Major League Baseball outfielder  for the Brooklyn Dodgers and Philadelphia Phillies from 1937 to 1939.

In 1933, he passed himself off as 20 years old, when in reality, he was 25. He did this in hopes to have a more successful career. 

In 315 games over three seasons, Brack posted a .279 batting average (273-for-980) with 150 runs, 70 doubles, 18 triples, 16 home runs, 113 RBI, 92 bases on balls, .341 on-base percentage and .436 slugging percentage. He finished his major league career with a .969 fielding percentage playing at first base and all three outfield positions.

Brack died of suicide via gunshot at age 51.

References

External links

https://sabr.org/bioproj/person/gibby-brack/

1908 births
1960 suicides
Major League Baseball outfielders
Brooklyn Dodgers players
Philadelphia Phillies players
Asheville Tourists players
Louisville Colonels (minor league) players
Indianapolis Indians players
St. Paul Saints (AA) players
Baltimore Orioles (IL) players
Jersey City Giants players
Oklahoma City Indians players
Montreal Royals players
Greenville Majors players
Gainesville Owls players
El Dorado Oilers players
Marshall Tigers players
Baseball players from Chicago
Suicides by firearm in Texas